María Elena Estavillo Flores is a Mexican economist, academic and former Commissioner of the Federal Telecommunications Institute. She holds a bachelor's degree in economics from ITESM as well as M.A. and PhD in economics from the University of Paris. In 2016 and 2017 consecutively, she was featured in Forbes magazine as one of the country's most powerful women. She was also listed as one of the most relevant women in the field in the world by

References

Bibliography
 

Living people
Year of birth missing (living people)
Place of birth missing (living people)
Mexican economists
Mexican women economists